Antigua is an island in the Caribbean

Antigua can also refer to:

Places
Antigua and Barbuda, the nation of which the island of Antigua is part
Antigua Guatemala, a city in the central mountains of Guatemala
Antigua, Fuerteventura, a municipality in the Canary Islands, Spain
Antigua, Queensland, a locality in Australia

People
 Orlando Antigua (born 1973), Dominican-American basketball player

Ships
Four successive ships of the Royal Navy named 
, a turbo-electric liner of the United Fruit Company

See also
Antiguan (disambiguation)
La Antigua (disambiguation)
Antigua Winds, wind music instrument brand
Antiqua (disambiguation)